Montbard is a railway station located in Montbard, Côte-d'Or, France. The station was opened on 16 September 1867 and is located on the Paris–Marseille railway. The train services are operated by SNCF.

Train services
The following train services serve the station as of 2022:

High speed services (TGV) Paris - Dijon - Besançon (- Mulhouse)
High speed services (TGV) Paris - Dijon - Chalon-sur-Saône
High speed services (TGV) Lille - Charles de Gaulle Airport - Dijon - Mulhouse
Regional services (TER Bourgogne) Paris - Sens - Laroche-Migennes - Montbard - Dijon (- Lyon)
Regional services (TER Bourgogne) Auxerre - Laroche-Migennes - Montbard - Dijon

References

Railway stations in Côte-d'Or
Railway stations in France opened in 1867